Larry Ahern is an American computer game designer, writer, artist, and animator. He is best known for being the co-project leader on The Curse of Monkey Island, alongside Jonathan Ackley.

Career
Larry Ahern began his career as an artist and animator on Monkey Island 2: LeChuck's Revenge in 1991.  He was lead animator on Full Throttle in 1995, and finished his tenure at LucasArts as co-project leader on The Curse of Monkey Island in 1997.

After leaving LucasArts, he joined Microsoft in 2001. While there, he worked as an artist on Blood Wake and Microsoft Flight Simulator X.  After leaving Microsoft, he co-founded Crackpot Entertainment with former LucasArts alumnus Mike Levine. Through Crackpot Entertainment, they developed the action-adventure game Insecticide,. Part I of Insecticide for the PC was released in 2008. However, development of Part II of the game for the PC was never completed due to a lack of funding. In July 2012, all of the cut scene videos from Part II were released by Levine and Ahern on YouTube. In an interview, Ahern expressed the troublesome development of Part II with the publisher SouthPeak "the new publisher pretty much ignored us for a month or two while they "evaluated" the prospects of our title, which also wasn't a good sign. They ultimately decided not to publish Part II, and we never got much of an explanation, but I'm guessing someone there with a calculator was predicting trouble with the whole venture. Either that or they were just creeped out by bugs.".

He has since been working freelance creating interactive entertainment for amusement parks.  In this function, he co-designed Walt Disney World's Sorcerers of the Magic Kingdom with his former Curse of Monkey Island co-lead, Jonathan Ackley, in 2012.

Games
1991 Monkey Island 2: LeChuck's Revenge, artist, animator (LucasArts)
1992 Super Star Wars, artist, animator (LucasArts)
1993 Zombies Ate My Neighbors, additional art (LucasArts)
1993 Star Wars: Rebel Assault, additional art (LucasArts)
1993 Day of the Tentacle, artist (LucasArts)
1993 Sam & Max Hit the Road, artist (LucasArts)
1995 Full Throttle, lead animator (LucasArts)
1997 The Curse of Monkey Island, co-project leader (LucasArts)
2001 Blood Wake, artist (Microsoft)
2006 Microsoft Flight Simulator X, artist (Microsoft)
2008 Insecticide, co-project leader (Crackpot Entertainment)
2012 Sorcerers of the Magic Kingdom, co-designer (The Walt Disney Company)

References

External links
 

Year of birth missing (living people)
Living people
Lucasfilm people
American video game designers
American video game directors